Nationality words link to articles with information on the nation's poetry or literature (for instance, Irish or France).

Events

Works published

Births
Death years link to the corresponding "[year] in poetry" article. There are conflicting or unreliable sources for the birth years of many people born in this period; where sources conflict, the poet is listed again and the conflict is noted:

966:
 Fujiwara no Kintō (died 1041), Japanese poet, publisher of the Shūi Wakashū; he created the concept of the Thirty-six Poetry Immortals
 Sei Shōnagon (died 1017), author of The Pillow Book

967:
 Dec 7 – Abū-Sa'īd Abul-Khayr (died 1049), Persian poet
 Badi' al-Zaman al-Hamadhani (died 1007), Arab poet

Deaths
Birth years link to the corresponding "[year] in poetry" article:

965:
 Ahmad ibn-al-Husayn al-Mutanabbi (born 915), Arab (Iraqi-born) poet

966:
 Fujiwara no Asatada (born 910), one of the Thirty-six Poetry Immortals of Japan
 Sri Ponna (born 939), writing in the Kannada language

967:
 Abu al-Faraj al-Isfahani (born 897), Iranian scholar of Arab-Quraysh origin who is noted for collecting and preserving ancient Arabic lyrics and poems in his major work, the Kitāb al-Aghānī

968:
 Abu Firas al-Hamdani (born 935), Arab poet

See also

 Poetry
 10th century in poetry
 10th century in literature
 List of years in poetry

Other events:
 Other events of the 12th century
 Other events of the 13th century

10th century:
 10th century in poetry
 10th century in literature

Notes

10th-century poetry
Poetry